Snihurivka is a small city in Bashtanka Raion, Mykolaiv Oblast, Ukraine. It was occupied by Russia from March 2022 until early November 2022. It hosts the administration of the Snihurivka urban hromada. Population of Snihurivka is

History 
Snihurivka was a settlement in Kherson uyezd in Kherson Governorate of the Russian Empire. During World War II the settlement was captured by German troops in 1941 and liberated by Soviet forces in the Bereznegovatoye–Snigirevka offensive of March 1944. The Germans operated a Nazi prison in the settlement. Between 30 and 100 Jews from Snihurivka and nearby localities were murdered by Germans in the vicinity of the town in late September 1941. It gained city status in 1961.

Until 18 July 2020, Snihurivka was the administrative center of Snihurivka Raion. The raion was abolished that day as part of the administrative reform of Ukraine, which reduced the number of raions of Mykolaiv Oblast to four. The area of Snihurivka Raion was merged into Bashtanka Raion.

2022 Russian invasion of Ukraine 

During the 2022 Russian invasion of Ukraine, Snihurivka was shelled and was reportedly occupied by Russian forces starting 19 March 2022. Snihurivka is a critical transportation hub with highways and railroad lines, connecting Snihurivka with the neighboring oblast capital Kherson.

In September 2022, following a sham referendum, which locals protested against, there were conflicting reports and rumors about the status of Snihurivka due to its vicinity near the front line, framing the attrition warfare as a retreat. On 5 October 2022, Mykolaiv Military Civilian Administration Head Yuriy Barbashov stated on Telegram that "Snihurivka remains under the control of Russian troops", while Mykolaiv Oblast Governor Vitalii Kim noted that officials were "seeking to confirm that Russian officers have left but there are troops still remaining there". On 9 November, the Russian Defense Minister Sergei Shoigu announced the withdrawal of Russian forces from the right bank of the Dnipro River. The next day, Ukrainian forces re-entered the town and raised the Ukrainian flag.

The bodies of 27 dead civilians were found in de-occupied Snihurivka after its liberation. All of them have signs of violent death, in particular, bullet wounds, explosive injuries, etc. Criminal proceedings have been initiated.
No mass burial sites were found in the city, as it was in Bucha (Kyiv region). The bodies were buried in individual graves.

Transportation 
The Snihurivka railway station was built in 1911 as part of the Odesa Railways.

Demographics 
Recent population estimates or census results:

References

Cities in Mykolaiv Oblast
Cities of district significance in Ukraine
Populated places established in the Russian Empire
Khersonsky Uyezd